Moose Jaw was a territorial electoral district for the Legislative Assembly of Northwest Territories, Canada.

The riding was created by royal proclamation in 1883 and abolished in 1905 when Alberta and Saskatchewan were created.

Members of the Legislative Assembly (MLAs)

Election results

1883 election

1885 election

1888 election

1891 election

1894 election

1897 election

The by-election was held to confirm Mr. Ross to his appointment as the Territorial Secretary, the Territorial Treasurer and Minister of Public Works and Minister of Agriculture in the Northwest Territories cabinet.

1898 election

1901 election

1902 election

References

External links 
Website of the Legislative Assembly of Northwest Territories

Former electoral districts of Northwest Territories